The 1993 Turkmenistan Higher League (Ýokary Liga) season was the second season of Turkmenistan's professional football league. Its first round started March 27, 1993, and finished October 3, 1993, and the second round was between November 3 and December 4.

Participants
The 1993 Ýokary Liga season was composed of the following clubs:

 Nebitçi Balkanabat
 Büzmeýin
 Turan Daşoguz
 Hazar Türkmenbaşy
 Kolhozçy Türkmengala
 Köpetdag Aşgabat
 Lebap Çärjew
 Merw Mary
 Balkan Nebitdag
 TSHT Aşgabat

Club name changes
At the start of season:
Sport Büzmeýin became Büzmeýin
Zarýa-MALS Daşoguz became Turan Daşoguz
Hazar Krasnowodsk became Hazar Türkmenbaşy
Arlan Nebitdag became Şazada Nebitdag
Şazada Nebitdag became Balkan Nebitdag

First round

League table

Second round

Championship round

Relegation round

Ýokary Liga seasons
Turk
Turk
1993 in Turkmenistani football